Maria Cristina Facchini is a geoscientist and a research director at the National Research Council. Her studies focus on the physics and chemistry of aerosols and clouds, and their effect on our atmosphere and climate.

Early life 
Facchini was born in Lugo, in the province of Ravenna, Italy, on April 19, 1960. She graduated magna com laude in 1985 at the University of Bologna with a major in Chemistry.

Research and career 
Facchini's researches the chemical and physical processes of aerosols in the atmosphere, both natural (clouds) and man-made, and how these processes affect phenomena including regional air quality, ultraviolet radiation levels, and climate. These impact, as her group's website puts it, "the fundamental necessities of human existence", such as human health, food production, and water resources.

Based at the University of Bologna in Italy since the 1980s, Facchini works at the Institute of Atmospheric Sciences and Climate. She has published over 100 papers, many of which have been critically acclaimed. She is on multiple panels/boards, including, the Scientific Advisory Board of the Max Planck Institute for Chemistry in Mainz, Germany since 2011.

Honours, awards 
Facchini has received several honours and awards during her career:

 2017: Facchini becomes Commander of the Order "to the merit of the Italian Republic" by the President of the Italian Republic;  
 2014: Highly Cited Researcher, by Thomson Reuters, that place Facchini within the 1% of the most cited geoscientists in the world; 
 2014: Winner of the Haagen-Smit Prize, yearly awarded to a relevant publication in the field of Atmospheric Sciences.

References 

Year of birth missing (living people)
Living people
Italian earth scientists
Italian women scientists